Subtractive color or subtractive color mixing predicts the spectral power distribution of light after it passes through successive layers of partially absorbing media. This idealized model is the essential principle of how dyes and inks are used in color printing and photography where the perception of color is elicited after white light passes through microscopic "stacks" of partially absorbing media allowing some wavelengths of light to reach the eye and not others.

Process 
The subtractive color mixing model predicts the resultant spectral power distribution of light filtered through overlaid partially absorbing materials on a reflecting or transparent surface. Each layer partially absorbs some wavelengths of light from the illumination spectrum while letting others pass through, resulting in a colored appearance. The resultant spectral power distribution is predicted by sequentially taking the product of the spectral power distributions of the incoming light and transmissivity at each filter.

RYB 

RYB (red, yellow, blue) is the traditional set of primary colors used for mixing pigments. It is used in art and art education, particularly in painting. It predated modern scientific color theory.

Red, yellow, and blue are the primary colors of the RYB color "wheel".  The secondary colors, violet (or purple), orange, and green (VOG) make up another triad, conceptually formed by mixing equal amounts of red and blue, red and yellow, and blue and yellow, respectively.

The RYB primary colors became the foundation of 18th-century theories of color vision as the fundamental sensory qualities blended in the perception of all physical colors and equally in the physical mixture of pigments or dyes. These theories were enhanced by 18th-century investigations of a variety of purely psychological color effects, in particular, the contrast between "complementary" or opposing hues produced by color afterimages and in the contrasting shadows in colored light. These ideas and many personal color observations were summarized in two founding documents in color theory: the Theory of Colors (1810) by the German poet and government minister Johann Wolfgang von Goethe, and The Law of Simultaneous Color Contrast (1839) by the French industrial chemist Michel-Eugène Chevreul.

In late 19th and early to mid-20th-century commercial printing, use of the traditional RYB terminology persisted even though the more versatile CMY (cyan, magenta, yellow) triad had been adopted, with the cyan sometimes referred to as "process blue" and the magenta as "process red".

CMY and CMYK color models and printing processes 

In color printing, the usual primary colors are cyan, magenta and yellow (CMY). Cyan is the complement of red, meaning that the cyan serves as a filter that absorbs red. The amount of cyan applied to a white sheet of paper controls how much of the red in white light will be reflected back from the paper. Ideally, the cyan is completely transparent to green and blue light and has no effect on those parts of the spectrum. Magenta is the complement of green, and yellow the complement of blue. Combinations of different amounts of the three can produce a wide range of colors with good saturation.

In inkjet color printing and typical mass production photomechanical printing processes, a black ink K (Key) component is included, resulting in the CMYK color model. The black ink serves to cover unwanted tints in dark areas of the printed image, which result from the imperfect transparency of commercially practical CMY inks; to improve image sharpness, which tends to be degraded by imperfect registration of the three color elements; and to reduce or eliminate consumption of the more expensive color inks where only black or gray is required.

Purely photographic color processes almost never include a K component, because in all common processes the CMY dyes used are much more perfectly transparent, there are no registration errors to camouflage, and substituting a black dye for a saturated CMY combination, a trivial prospective cost-benefit at best, is technologically impractical in non-electronic analog photography.

See also
Additive color
Color mixing
Color motion picture film
Color space
Color theory
Primary color

References

Further reading

External links
 Stanford University CS 178 interactive Flash demo  comparing additive and subtractive color mixing.

Color space
Color